Landes Bioscience is an Austin, Texas-based publisher of bioscience journals. Cell Cycle, one of its first two journals, achieved the highest percent increase in total citations in molecular biology and genetics for the period of July–August 2007, with 1490 papers cited 6228 times. It was acquired by Taylor & Francis in June 2014.

See also 
 Journals published by Landes Bioscience

References

External links
 

Publishing companies of the United States
Companies based in Austin, Texas
Publishing companies established in 1997
1997 establishments in Texas
Academic publishing companies